Genevieve Valentine (born 1981) is an American science fiction and fantasy writer. Her first novel, Mechanique: A tale of the Circus Tresaulti, won the Crawford Award for a first fantasy novel, and was shortlisted for the Nebula.

Genevieve Valentine is currently writing The Persona Series for Saga Press (edited by Navah Wolfe), a science fiction thriller series which so far includes the novels Persona (2015) and Icon (2016).

From 2014 until 2015, Valentine scripted a new series for DC Comics featuring Catwoman, working with artists Garry Brown and David Messina. Afterwards, she worked on Batman and Robin Eternal as scripter.

Bibliography

References

1981 births
Living people
American fantasy writers
21st-century American novelists
21st-century American women writers
Women science fiction and fantasy writers
Place of birth missing (living people)
American women novelists